Laurens Peninsula is a rugged peninsula surmounted by several ice-covered peaks that forms the northwestern part of Heard Island in the southern Indian Ocean. The name was applied by the Australian National Antarctic Research Expedition following their survey in 1948. It derives from the existing name Cape Laurens, applied for the northwestern extremity of this peninsula after the American bark Laurens which, under Captain Franklin F. Smith, visited Heard Island in 1855–56 and assisted in initiating sealing operations there.

A small hill called Macey Cone sits at the northwest end of the peninsula.

References

External links
 Map of Laurens Peninsula and the northwestern coast of Heard Island
 Map of Heard Island and McDonald Islands, including all major topographical features

Peninsulas of Antarctica
Landforms of Heard Island and McDonald Islands
Laurens Peninsula